is a Japanese football player. He plays for German Oberliga Niederrhein club FSV Duisburg.

Club statistics
Updated to 23 February 2020.

References

External links

Profile at Matsue City FC

1994 births
Association football people from Kanagawa Prefecture
Living people
Japanese footballers
Association football forwards
Tokai University alumni
YSCC Yokohama players
Blaublitz Akita players
Matsue City FC players
Tochigi City FC players
J3 League players
Japan Football League players
Oberliga (football) players
Japanese expatriate footballers
Expatriate footballers in Germany
Japanese expatriate sportspeople in Germany